"Rock Steady" is a single from Bonnie Raitt's album Road Tested (1995), written by Bryan Adams and Gretchen Peters. The song was written as a duet with Bryan Adams and Bonnie Raitt for her Road Tested Tour, which also became one of her albums. The original demo version of the song appears on Adams' 1996 single "Let's Make a Night to Remember".

Charts

References

1995 songs
Bryan Adams songs
Bonnie Raitt songs
Song recordings produced by Don Was
Songs written by Gretchen Peters
Songs written by Bryan Adams
Capitol Records singles
Male–female vocal duets